Harold's Chicken Shack (also referred to as The Fried Chicken King, Harold's Chicken, or simply Harold's) is a popular fried chicken restaurant based in Chicago, Illinois. The chain operates primarily in Chicago's predominantly black communities, but has additional locations in Carbondale, Illinois; Springfield, Illinois; Northwest Indiana; Indianapolis, Indiana; Phoenix, Arizona; Atlanta, Georgia; Las Vegas, Nevada; St. Louis, Missouri; Houston, Texas; and Los Angeles, California.

History
Harold Pierce, an African-American entrepreneur who moved to Chicago in 1943, founded the restaurant on June 22, 1950 at the corner of 47th Street and Kenwood, near the estate where he worked as a chauffeur. Harold and his wife also operated a soul food restaurant on 39th street called the H&H (Harold&Hilda); their specialties were dumplings and chicken feet. Pierce differed from other fast-food innovators in his development of the Harold's brand. He wanted each of his franchises to develop its own personality rather than forcing each to fit the same mold. Some Harold's restaurants are very informal, with take-away chicken served by employees standing behind a window of bulletproof glass (originally introduced as a necessity rather than an aesthetic concern). Others offer the option to dine in. Harold's Chicken Shacks may or may not offer fountain drinks, additional menu items, catering services, or delivery. The only constants are the basic chicken dinners and the emblem of a cook chasing a chicken with a cleaver. Even this varies greatly, sometimes rendered in lights and sometimes hand-painted. Often, the cook is dressed like a King. Harold's restaurants are also referred to as "Harold's: The Fried Chicken King", which can be seen on many of the older South Side signs.

Harold's Chicken Shack is located primarily in Chicago, Illinois with 40 locations across the city, particularly on its South Side. The large number of South Side locations were originally a consequence of systemic racism which limited Pierce's expansion opportunities to black neighborhoods.  There are dozens of "shacks" on Chicago's South Side and the neighboring southern suburbs, several on the West Side and a few on the North Side.

Connection to culture
Harold's Chicken Shack is a part of the culture of Chicago's South Side. The restaurant is often referenced by Chicago's hip hop community including Kanye West, Common, Rhymefest, Juice, G Herbo, Chance the Rapper, Freddie Gibbs, Lupe Fiasco and Dreezy. Rapper Wale stated in the song That Way, that Harold's Chicken was overrated. Top Dawg Entertainment rapper Kendrick Lamar mentioned Harold's Chicken in Fredo Santana's song, "Jealous", in which Lamar is featured, where he claimed he loved it so much he flew a private jet there straight from Rome.

Harold's has been shown in a scene on the television show South Side, as well as part of the music video for BJ The Chicago Kid's "It's True". Harold's is also shown next to the bar visited early in the movie Weird Science.

See also
 List of fast-food chicken restaurants

References

Fast-food poultry restaurants
Fast-food chains of the United States
Fast-food franchises
Companies based in Chicago
Cuisine of Chicago
Restaurants in Chicago
Restaurants established in 1950
1950 establishments in Illinois
Chicken chains of the United States